Mountain Grove Cemetery, Bridgeport, Connecticut, was laid out in 1849 in the then popular rural cemetery design in a park-like, rural setting away from the center of the city.

The cemetery was founded by showman P. T. Barnum, who himself is buried there. "The original grounds were surveyed and designed by Horatio Stone and Mr. [John] Moody," the cemetery's first superintendent.

Notable interments
Notables interred here include:

 Neal Ball, baseball player
 P. T. Barnum, showman and entrepreneur
 William D. Bishop, politician
 Fanny Crosby, gospel hymn composer, poet
 Vernon Dalhart, country singer and songwriter
 Robert Lawson, the Caldecott and Newbery medal winning author and illustrator.
 John E. W. Thompson, an African-American minister resident of Haiti and chargé d'affaires to San Domingo.
 General Tom Thumb, the little person, whose monument includes a life-size statue of him at the top of a tall obelisk; and his wife Lavinia Warren
 Kathleen Moore, precursor to USCG, United States Lighthouse Service; credited with saving 21 lives as a light housekeeper. USCGC Kathleen Moore was named after her in her honor.

Civil War monument
The cemetery includes a Civil War monument, Pro Patria.  The granite stele monument with bronze plaque, raised in 1906 by the Bridgeport Elias Howe Grand Army of the Republic post and the State of Connecticut, is dedicated "IN LOVING MEMORY OF THOSE WHO DID NOT RETURN".  The monument, by the Bridgeport sculptor Paul Winters Morris (1865–1916) includes bas-relief figures of soldiers with heads bowed. The monument is at the front of a plot marked by pyramids of cannonballs that contains the graves of about 83 Civil War veterans.

See also

History of Bridgeport, Connecticut

References

Geography of Bridgeport, Connecticut
Connecticut in the American Civil War
Cemeteries in Fairfield County, Connecticut
Tourist attractions in Bridgeport, Connecticut
Rural cemeteries